Litlkorsnestinden, or Trakta, is a mountain in Hadsel Municipality in Nordland county, Norway. The summit is the most difficult to reach in Norway, and requires climbing up to grade 6-. (NOR). It was first ascended in 1910 by Alf Bonnevie Bryn, Ferdinand Schjelderup and Carl Wilhelm Rubenson.

References

Hadsel
Mountains of Nordland